Valkenburg Castle is a 1980 board game published by Task Force Games.

Gameplay
Valkenburg Castle is a fantasy game about a dungeon in which the players use armies to either capture or defend the castle.

Reception
Jerry Epperson reviewed Valkenburg Castle in The Space Gamer No. 28. Epperson commented that "Valkenburg Castle would be worth the money to a 'hard-core' fantasy gamer; others might do better elsewhere. A lot of good ideas went into this game, but some of them got lost."

John Lambshead reviewed Valkenburg Castle for White Dwarf #21, giving it an overall rating of 8 out of 10, and stated that "It has a good solid system on which a gamer can hang his own favourite rules. At the price it must be considered excellent value for money."

In a retrospective review of Valkenburg Castle in Black Gate, John ONeill said "It was an appealing variation on the classic loot-and-scoot dungeon mechanic, with the added bonus of a compelling backstory, a loyal army, and a chance to win back a crown. What's not to like?"

Reviews
Pegasus #2 (1981)
Fantastic Science Fiction v27 n11

References

Board games introduced in 1980
Task Force Games games